Hapoel Ramat Gan Givatayim B.C. is a professional basketball club based in Givatayim, Israel. The club currently plays in the Israeli National League, the second division in Israel.

History
The team was founded in 1957. In 1960 the team was promoted for the first time to the Israeli Basketball Premier League, under the name Hapoel Ramat Gan - Givatayim, and relegated after only one season. In 1964 the group rose again, the first snowfall, but the temporal change Nsra League second group. In 1966 the group fell in League (League then the third), after one season it was back to League Group A, but in 1969 it again fell in the group League. It was back in Group A League in 1971.

In 1973 it rose League first group (then called for the group of Ramat Gan and Hapoel Ramat Gan - Givataim) movement has already finished the first group and the fourth place until the year 1984 the group did not do worse than fourth place.

Prominent players for the team were: Steve Kaplan, Hanan Keren, Or Goren, Avigdor Moskovitch (also played in Mtazrhim and abroad as well): Steve Slachter, Neal Walk, Cliff Fondkstr, and Steve Malovik. In addition Aimno the group of senior trainers such as: Zvika Sherf and Arie Maliniak, but despite everything the team failed to win a championship. The team finished second six times instead of daring Cup finals five times in the country, but never managed to win a Cup.

The biggest surprise in 1984 was an amazing team to Maccabi Tel Aviv in the semifinal of the State Cup after it defeated 76-80. and It seems group would finally win the title, but missed the final to Hapoel Tel Aviv B.C. 73-79.

After the 1984 broke the association concerned to cover the debt each year groups the team began its deterioration. In 1987 League second group fell a new year fell another group broke third League final. At the end of the 1987/88 season Ramat Gan has dissolved due to financial reasons.

In 2011, Elizitur Ramat Gan B.C. and Hapoel Givataim B.C. merged to form Hapoel Ramat Gan Givatayim B.C..Eurobasket.com In the 2011–12 season, the team debuted in the Liga Bet, the fifth tier in Israel.

Season by season

Roster

Notable players
 Albert Hemmo
 Chaim Zlotikman (born 1957)

References

External links 
 Official website (in Hebrew)
 Facebook page (in Hebrew)
 Instagram page (in Hebrew)

Ramat Gan
Basketball teams established in 2011
Ramat Gan
Sport in Ramat Gan
2011 establishments in Israel